Cyrus Ashkon Margono (born 9 November 2001) is an Indonesian-American professional soccer player who plays as a goalkeeper for Greek Super League 2 club Panathinaikos B.

Early life
Cyrus Margono was born in New York, United States on November 9, 2001. His father was born in Bali and raised in Surabaya, East Java. Meanwhile his mother is from Iran.

Club career

In 2015, Margono trained with the youth academy of Italian Serie A side Inter. In 2021, he signed for Panathinaikos B in Greece.  On 16 April 2022, he debuted for Panathinaikos B during a 0–3 loss to Levadiakos.

International career

Margono is eligible to represent Iran and Indonesia internationally through his parents.

Career statistics

Club

Notes

References

External links
 

2001 births
People from Mount Kisco, New York
Living people
American soccer players
Association football goalkeepers
American expatriate soccer players
American people of Indonesian descent
American people of Iranian descent
Denver Pioneers men's soccer players
Kentucky Wildcats men's soccer players
Panathinaikos F.C. B players
Super League Greece 2 players
American expatriate sportspeople in Greece
Expatriate footballers in Greece